Yang Xiaoyan may refer to:

 Yang Xiaoyan (bridge) (杨小燕)
 Yang Xiaoyan (sailor) (楊曉燕)
 Yang Xiaoyan (writer) (杨筱燕), nominated for Golden Rooster Award for Best Writing